Guilford County Schools is a school district in the state of North Carolina. The state's third largest district, it serves Greensboro and High Point.

Schools

Elementary schools 

 Alamance Elementary
 Alderman Elementary 
 Allen Jay Elementary
 Archer Elementary
 Bessemer Elementary
 Bluford Elementary
 Brightwood Elementary
 Brooks Global Studies
 Claxton Elementary
 Colfax Elementary
 Cone Elementary
 Erwin Elementary
 Fairview Elementary
 Falkener Elementary
 Florence Elementary
 Foust Elementary
 Frasier Elementary
 General Greene Elementary
 Gibsonville Elementary
 Gillespie Park Elementary
 Guilford Elementary
 Hunter Elementary
 Irving Park Elementary
 Jamestown Elementary
 Jefferson Elementary
 Jesse Wharton Elementary
 Johnson Street Global Studies
 Jones Elementary
 Joyner Elementary
 Kirkman Park Elementary
 Lindley Elementary
 Madison Elementary
 Mcleansville Elementary
 Millis Road Elementary
 Monticello-Brown Summit Elementary
 Montlieu Elementary Academy of Technology
 Morehead Elementary
 Murphy Traditional Academy
 Nathanael Greene Elementary
 Northern Elementary
 Northwood Elementary
 Oak Hill Elementary
 Oak Ridge Elementary
 Oak View Elementary
 Parkview Elementary
 Pearce Elementary
 Peck Elementary
 Peeler Open Elementary
 Pilot Elementary
 Pleasant Garden Elementary
 Rankin Elementary
 Reedy Fork Elementary
 Sedalia Elementary
 Sedgefield Elementary
 Shadybrook Elementary
 Southern Elementary
 Southwest Elementary
 Sternberger Elementary
 Stokesdale Elementary
 Summerfield Elementary
 Sumner Elementary
 Triangle Lake Montessori Elementary
 Union Hill Elementary
 Vandalia Elementary
 Washington Elementary
 Wiley Elementary

Middle schools

Allen Middle
Allen Jay preparatory academy 
Brown Summit Middle
Eastern Guilford Middle
Ferndale Middle
Guilford Middle
Hairston Middle
Jackson Middle
Jamestown Middle
Johnson Street Global Studies
Kernodle Middle
Kiser Middle
Academy at Lincoln
Melvin C Swann Jr. Middle School
Mendenhall Middle
Northeast Guilford Middle
Northern Guilford Middle
Northwest Guilford Middle
Penn-Griffin School for the Arts
Southeast Guilford Middle
Southern Guilford Middle
Southwest Guilford Middle
Welborn Academy of Science and Technology

High schools

 Academy at Central
 Academy at Smith
 Ben L. Smith High School
 The Early College at Guilford
 Eastern Guilford High School
 Greensboro College Middle College
 Grimsley Senior High School
 High Point Central High School
 James B. Dudley High School
 Middle College at Bennett
 Middle College at GTCC - Greensboro
 Middle College at GTCC - High Point
 Middle College at GTCC - Jamestown
 Middle College at NC A&T
 Northeast Guilford High School
 Northern Guilford High School
 Northwest Guilford High School
 Lucy Ragsdale High School
 Penn-Griffin School for the Arts
 Southeast Guilford High School
 Southern Guilford High School
 Southwest Guilford High School
 T. Wingate Andrews High School
 Walter Hines Page Senior High School
 Weaver Academy
 Western Guilford High School
 The STEM Early College at NCAT

References

External links
 

School districts in North Carolina
Education in Guilford County, North Carolina